The 1995 Russian Indoor Athletics Championships was the 4th edition of the national championship in indoor track and field for Russia. It was held on 24–26 February at the WGAFC Indoor Stadium in Volgograd. A total of 26 events (13 for men and 13 for women) were contested over the two-day competition. The racewalking events for men and women were dropped from the programme and ceased to be a regular part of the championships thereafter.

Championships
In the winter of 1995, Russian championships were also held in the following disciplines:

3–4 February — Russian Combined Events Indoor Championships (Chelyabinsk)
4–5 February – Russian 24-Hour Run Indoor Championships (Podolsk)

Results

Men

Women 

 Larisa Peleshenko, the original winner of the women's shot put with a mark of 19.52 m, was subsequently disqualified as she failed a drug test prior to the championships on 20 February 1995 in the Swedish city of Huddinge. She was banned from competition for four years, and her results after the date of sampling were annulled, including first place at the national indoor championships.

Russian Combined Events Championships 
The Russian Combined Events Indoor Championships were contested on 3–4 February 1995 in Chelyabinsk in the Ural State University of Physical Culture Stadium. Svetlana Moskalets achieved the second best score in women's indoor pentathlon ever at that time.

Men

Women

Russian 24-Hour Run Indoor Championships 
The Russian 24-Hour Run Indoor Championships was held on 4–5 February in Podolsk on the 133-meter circle of the arena of the local youth sports school. Competitions were held as part of the Podolsky Day super marathon and were held in memory of Nikolay Safin, who established a world best two years earlier (275,576 m),

Men

Women

International team selection 
Following the results of the championships, taking into account the qualifying standards, the Russian team for the 1995 IAAF World Indoor Championships included:

Men

60 m: Andrey Grigorev, Yuriy Mizera
400 m: Mikhail Vdovin
1500 m: Vyacheslav Shabunin
60 m hurdles: Evgeny Pechonkin
Pole vault: Maksim Tarasov, Vadim Strogalev
Long jump: Evgeniy Tretyak, Yuriy Naumkin
Triple jump: Dmitry Byzov
Shot put: Yevgeny Palchikov

Women

60 m: Nadezhda Roshchupkina, Yekaterina Leshcheva
200 m: Natalia Voronova†, Svetlana Goncharenko
400 m: Irina Privalova†, Tatyana Chebykina
4 × 400m relay: Tatyana Chebykina, Yelena Ruzina, Yekaterina Kulikova, Svetlana Goncharenko
800 m: Yelena Afanasyeva, Irina Samorokova
1500 m: Lyubov Kremlyova†
3000 m: Mariya Pantyukhova, Lidiya Vasilevskaya
60 m hurdles: Aleksandra Paskhina
High jump: Yelena Gulyayeva†, Tatyana Motkova
Long jump: Lyudmila Galkina, Irina Mushailova
Triple jump: Yolanda Chen†, Mariya Sokova
Shot put: Larisa Peleshenko
Pentathlon: Svetlana Moskalets, Irina Tyukhay

† Had exemption for selection and allowed not to compete at the national championships

References

Results
Откаленко В., Шедченко А. Свет и тени Волгограда // Лёгкая атлетика : журнал. — 1995. — № 3. — С. 7—8.

Russian Indoor Athletics Championships
Russian Indoor Athletics Championships
Russian Indoor Athletics Championships
Russian Indoor Athletics Championships
Sports competitions in Volgograd